The Descriptio Wormatiensis civitatis ('description of the city of Worms'), also known as the Wormser Mauerbauordnung ('wall-building ordinance of Worms'), is an ordinance from about 900 concerning the maintenance of the city wall of Worms, Germany.

Manuscript and editions
Zorn's work, which dates to 1576, combines material from several sources, including the Annales Wormatienses and the Chronicon Wormatiense. The combined Descriptio, Annales and Chronicon were published under the title Annales Wormatienses by G. H. Pertz. The Descriptio has been published three times: by Pertz, by Boos and by Van De Kieft and Niermeyer.

Content
The ordinance appears in the manuscript under the rubric Descriptio Wormatiensis civitatis facta a Theodolacho episcopo Wormatiensi anno 873, qui obiit in Neuweiller anno 914 kal. sept., episcopatus anno quadrageismo primo, "a description of the city of Worms made in the year 873  by Thietlach, bishop of Worms, who died in Neuweiler in the year 914 on 1 September, in the forty-first year of his episcopate".

Issued by Bishop Thietlach, the Descriptio is more than a description. It is an ordinance assigning Mauerbaupflicht, i.e., the construction and upkeep of specific sections of wall, to both neighbourhoods within Worms and the villages or manors outside it. The ordinance is a unique witness for its place and time. Lynette Olson calls it "a glimpse of transalpine urban life at its nadir, but still organised".

Places mentioned
The following places are mentioned in the Descriptio:

Friesenquartier
Rudelsheim
Gimbsheim
Eich
Hamm
Ibersheim
Rheindürckheim
Alsheim
Mettenheim
Rheinquartier
Murbach Abbey
Pfauenpforte
Heimgereide
Bobenheim
Ligrisheim
Roxheim
Oggersheim
Hemmingesheim
Ruchheim
Karlbach
Kirchheim
Andreaspforte
Eisbach
Mertesheim

Pfrimm
Mühlbach
Monzernheim
Dienheim

References

Worms, Germany
Medieval Latin texts

de:Mauerbauordnung (Worms)